The 10th century was the period from 901 (CMI) through 1000 (M) in accordance with the Julian calendar, and the last century of the 1st millennium.

In China the Song dynasty was established. The Muslim World experienced a cultural zenith, especially in al-Andalus under the Caliphate of Córdoba and in the Samanid Empire under Ismail Samani. Additionally, there was a cultural flourishing for the Byzantine Empire and the First Bulgarian Empire.

The Medievalist and historian of technology Lynn White said that "to the modern eye, it is very nearly the darkest of the Dark Ages ... if it was dark, it was the darkness of the womb". Similarly, Helen Waddell wrote that the 10th century was that which "in the textbooks disputes with the seventh the bad eminence, the nadir of the human intellect". Caesar Baronius famously described it as the Iron Century, because it was ‘iron in its harshness and in its sterility of goodness', while Lorenzo Valla gave it the similar name "Age of Lead and Iron".

Events
 c. 950: The beginning of the Medieval Warm Period.

Africa
 The Christian Nubian kingdom reaches its peak of prosperity and military power (see Early history of Sudan).
 c. 909: The Fatimid Caliphate arises in Kabylie, Kutama Tribe.
 c. 948: The Nri Kingdom in what is now Southeastern Nigeria starts.
 c. 980: Al-Azhar University is established in Cairo by the Fatimid dynasty.

Americas
 Collapse of the central lowland Maya civilization. Post-Classic Maya period begins. Chichen Itza becomes a regional capital on the Yucatán Peninsula
 Rise of the Toltecs in Mexico
 Golden age of the Ancestral Puebloans (Pueblo II Era)
 The Mississippian culture begins in present-day Southern United States
 987: Ah Mekat Tutul Xiu unified Uxmal, Mayapan, and Chichen Itza founding The League of Mayapan.

Asia 

 Buddhist temple construction commences at Bagan, Burma
 Seafarers and merchants from Champa had contacts with Brunei and Ma-i.
 907: Zhu Quanzhong deposes Emperor Ai of Tang and establishes a new Later Liang dynasty.
 907: Sumbing volcano erupts, according to Rukam inscription.
 907: King Balitung creates the Mantyasih inscription containing the list of Mataram kings, moves the capital from Mamratipura to Poh Pitu, and expands Prambanan temple.
 910: Parantaka I of the Chola Dynasty drives out the Pandyan from southern India into Lanka (now Sri Lanka), which he also eventually conquers.
 914: The Warmadewa dynasty rules Bali.
 919: the first use of gunpowder in battle occurs with the Chinese Battle of Langshan Jiang (Wolf Mountain River), where the Wuyue naval fleet under Qian Yuanguan defeats the Wu fleet. Qian had used flamethrowers ignited by gunpowder fuses to burn the Wu fleet.
 928: Ziyarid dynasty is established in northern Iran.
 928: During the reign of King Wawa, the capital of Mataram Kingdom in Kewu Plain is devastated, probably by the massive eruption of Mount Merapi.
 929: Mpu Sindok moves the seat of power of the Mataram Kingdom from Kewu Plain in Central Java to Tamwlang in East Java and establishes Isyana Dynasty. The shift is probably as a result of the eruption of Mount Merapi and/or invasion from Srivijaya.
 930s: Persian Shia Buyid dynasty establishes and controls central and western part of Iran as well as most of Iraq.
 936: Goryeo Dynasty unifies Later Three Kingdoms of Korea.
 937: Mpu Sindok moves the capital again from Tamwlang to Watugaluh, both near bank of Brantas River in modern Jombang in East Java.
 960: Zhao Kuangyin establishes Song dynasty.
 960: Seljuks convert to Islam.
 965: Khazar kingdom is attacked and defeated by Kievan Rus.
 971: Song Dynasty recorded the ancient sovereign state of Ma-i on the list of states conducting trade in the south seas and the government's efforts to regulate and tax this "luxurious" trade.
 975: Ghaznavids dynasty, as the first Turk Sultanate, was established in Central Asia.
 979: Song dynasty reunites China.
 980: Dynastic marriage between princess Mahendradatta of Javanese Isyanas and king Udayana of Balinese Warmadewas.
 Coastal cities on the Malay Peninsula are the seed for the first recorded Malay kingdoms.
 990: King Dharmawangsa of Mataram kingdom launches a naval invasion on Palembang in an unsuccessful attempt to conquer Srivijaya. (to 1006)
 990: Airlangga, son of King Udayana and Queen Mahendradatta was born in Bali.
 996: Dharmawangsa commissioned the translation of the Mahabharata into Old Javanese.
 999: Samanid dynasty was defeated and conquered by Ghaznavids.

Europe 

 Viking groups settle in northern France.
 The Hungarian army destroys the Bavarian forces under duke Liutpold and king Louis the Child in the Battle of Pressburg. All the German force is annihilated.
 Foundation of Cluny, first federated monastic order.
 Emperor Simeon the Great solidifies the First Bulgarian Empire as one of the most powerful states in Europe.
 Incursions of Magyar (Hungarian) cavalry throughout Western Europe (47 expeditions in Germany, Italy and France, 899–970).
 Collapse of Great Moravia.
 Lions become extinct in Europe by this date, with the last dying in Caucasus.
 907: Loire Vikings overrun Brittany; Breton court flees to the England of Edward the Elder.
 911: The Viking Rollo granted County of Rouen by France: official foundation of Normandy.
 917 (20 August 917) the Bulgarians destroyed the Byzantine army in the Battle of Anchialus, one of the bloodiest battles in the Middle Ages.
 927: official recognition of the first independent national Church in Europe, the Bulgarian Patriarchate.
 927: Kingdom of England becomes a unified state.
 c. 936: Gorm the Old becomes the first recognized king of Denmark, and thus the Danish Monarchy is founded.
 936: Alan II, with support from Æthelstan, commences the reconquest of Brittany.
 955: The Battle of Lechfeld (10 August 955) sees a decisive victory for Otto I the Great, King of the Germans, over the Hungarian harka Bulcsú and the chieftains Lél (Lehel) and Súr.
 966: Mieszko I, first duke of Poland, baptised a Christian.
968: Battle of Silistra between Russians and Bulgars.
 985–986: The Norseman Erik the Red begins the colonisation of Greenland.
 925: The medieval Croatian state becomes a unified kingdom under King Tomislav
 988: Vladimir I, Prince of Kievan Rus', baptised a Christian
c. 1000: Establishment of the Eastern Settlement and Western Settlement in Greenland.
 Second half of the 10th century: Page with David the Psalmist, from the Paris Psalter, is made. It is now kept at Bibliothéque Nationale, Paris.
 Late 10th or early 11th century: The Archangel Michael icon, is made. It is now kept at the Treasury of the Cathedral of Saint Mark, Venice.

Oceania
 c. 950: Formation of the Tu'i Tonga Empire and of the Tuʻi Tonga dynasty in Tonga.

Inventions, discoveries, introductions

 10th century–12th century: Seated Guaryin Bodhisattva, is made during the Liao dynasty. It is now kept at The Nelson-Atkins Museum of Art, Kansas City, Missouri.
 Construction begins on the Brihadeeswarar Temple of India, during the reign of Rajaraja Chola I.
 The first pound lock is invented by the Chinese engineer Qiao Weiyo, improving the canal lock system.
 Fire arrows are invented by the Chinese.
 Earliest known occurrence in Mexico of Lost-wax casting.
 Three of the Four Great Books of Song are published (the last one in 1013), which were enormous Chinese encyclopedias having millions of written Chinese characters each.
 Hops first mentioned in connection with beer brewing.
 Zhang Sixun of China uses for the first time liquid mercury (element) instead of water to power the escapement mechanism rotating an armillary sphere, since liquid mercury does not freeze easily like water during winter, and does not rust metal parts.

Notes

Further reading
Heinrich Fichtenau: Living in the Tenth century: Mentalities and Social Orders (transl. Patrick J. Geary; Chicago cool London: 1991).

 
10th century
Centuries